The 2006 Bausch & Lomb Championships was the 27th edition of that women's tennis tournament and was played on outdoor clay courts.  The tournament was classified as a Tier II event on the 2006 WTA Tour. The event took place at the Racquet Park at the Amelia Island Plantation, in Amelia Island, Florida, U.S. from April 3 through April 9, 2006. Nadia Petrova won the singles title.

Finals

Singles

 Nadia Petrova defeated  Francesca Schiavone, 6–4, 6–4
It was Petrova's 2nd title of the year and the 3rd of her career

Doubles

 Shinobu Asagoe /  Katarina Srebotnik defeated  Liezel Huber /  Sania Mirza, 6–2, 6–4

External links
 ITF tournament edition details

Bausch and Lomb Championships
Amelia Island Championships
Bausch & Lomb Championships
Bausch & Lomb Championships
Bausch & Lomb Championships